Marcos Juárez Airport is a public use airport located  west of Marcos Juárez, a city in the Córdoba Province of Argentina.

The Marcos Juarez VOR (Ident: MJZ) is located on the field.

See also

Transport in Argentina
List of airports in Argentina

References

External links 
OpenStreetMap - Marcos Juárez Airport
OurAirports - Marcos Juárez Airport

Airports in Argentina
Córdoba Province, Argentina